The Ennead is a novel by Jan Mark published in 1978 by Viking Kestrel in the UK and Thomas Y. Crowell in the US.

Plot summary
The Ennead is a novel set on the planet Erato, whose provincial inhabitants seek to control overpopulation by limiting the population and restricting immigration from the nearby planet Euterpe.

Reception
Kirkus Reviews states "though the playing out of her theme follows a standard outline, Mark's characters (including several memorable minor ones) are compellingly distinct, and her grim, dead-end village as real as the next one down the pike."

Greg Costikyan reviewed The Ennead in Ares Magazine #2 and commented that "The Ennead is not a nice novel; don't read it to the kiddies. It is, however, cleanly written, witty, and profoundly moving."

Reviews
Review by Pamela Cleaver (1979) in Foundation, #16 May 1979
Review by Barbara Krasnoff (1980) in Future Life, June 1980
Review by Richard E. Geis (1980) in Science Fiction Review, August 1980
Kliatt

References

1978 British novels
1978 science fiction novels
British science fiction novels
Viking Press books